A tiger mother is a term for a strict or demanding mother who controls her children and pushes them to be academically successful.

Tiger mother (or tiger mom) may also refer to:

Literature 
 Battle Hymn of the Tiger Mother, the 2011 book by Amy Chua that popularised the term

Television shows 
 Tiger Mom (TV series), a 2015 Chinese series
 Tiger Mom Blues, a 2017 Hong Kong series
 Tiger Mum, a 2014–2015 Singaporean series

See also 
 Authoritarian parenting, a restrictive, punishment-heavy parenting style
 Helicopter parent, a parent who pays extremely close attention to a child's or children's experiences and problems
 Hong Kong Kids phenomenon, referring to children who are regarded as spoilt and overly dependent
 Jewish mother, a stereotype of a nagging mother or wife
 Kyōiku mama, a Japanese "education mum"
 Stage mother, sometimes used as a negative stereotype